Fielden is an unincorporated community in south central Douglas County, Missouri, United States. Fielden is located on the floodplain of Fox Creek along County Road 14-343, south of Missouri Route 14 and west of Gentryville.

History
A post office called Fielden was established in 1894, and remained in operation until 1909. The community took its name from a local sawmill of the same name.

References

Unincorporated communities in Douglas County, Missouri
1894 establishments in Missouri
Unincorporated communities in Missouri